"Bad Boy" is a song by the American band Miami Sound Machine, led by Cuban-American singer Gloria Estefan, and released as the second single from their second English language album, and ninth overall, Primitive Love (1985). The song enjoyed much success following up on the band's mainstream breakthrough single, "Conga". It also was featured in and opened the film Three Men and a Baby.

Song history
The radio release and single was an edited and remixed version of the original album cut. It was remixed by Shep Pettibone. "Bad Boy" became the band's second Top Ten single in the United States, peaking at number eight on the Billboard Hot 100, and reached the top 20 in many other countries around the world. The single was certified Gold by the RIAA in the US for sales of 500,000 units and by the ARIA in Australia for sales of 35,000 copies. The song landed at number 79 on Billboard magazine's year-end chart of 1986.

Music videos
Two music videos were made for the song. One was made at the Fontainebleau Hotel in Miami Beach, in which Estefan plays a version of herself, trying to attract the attention of a Speedo-clad Hollywood star at the resort, whilst herself being pursued by a nerdy-looking fan. The other, directed by D.J. Webster, featured Estefan dancing with anthropomorphized alley cats, led by choreographer Russell Clark, in the style of the musical Cats.

Formats and track listings

 US Vinyl 12" Single (49 05338)
 "Bad Boy" (Remix)
 "Bad Boy" (Dub Version)

 US Vinyl 12" Promo Single (PRO1)
 "Bad Boy" (Single Remix)
 "Bad Boy" (Album Version)

 US Vinyl 7" Single (34 05805)
 "Bad Boy" (Single Remix)
 "Surrender Paradise" (Album Version)

 UK Vinyl 7" Single (A 6537)
 "Bad Boy" (Single Remix)
 "Movies" (Album Version)

 UK Vinyl 12" Single (TA 6537)
 "Bad Boy" (Single Remix)
 "Bad Boy" (Dub Version)
 "Movies" (Album Version)

Release history

Charts and certifications

Weekly charts

Year-end charts

Sales and certifications

Official versions 
Original versions
 Album Version  — 3:58

Remixes
 (Shep Pettibone) Single Remix — 3:42
 (Shep Pettibone) Remix — 6:11
 (Shep Pettibone) Dub Version — 6:43
 (Pablo Flores) Club Mix — 6:26
 (Pablo Flores) Rubber Club-Dub-Mix — 6:18
 (Eric Schilling) 1992 Remix — 3:46
 (Unreleased) Extended Dance Mix — 6:22
 (Unreleased) Extended Dub Mix — 6:15

References

External links
 

1985 singles
1986 singles
Miami Sound Machine songs
Gloria Estefan songs
1985 songs
Epic Records singles
Songs written by Lawrence Dermer